Festival de Música Coral Renascentista  is a festival of chorus music performing a cappella Renaissance compositions. It takes place at a church, Nossa Senhora das Dores (Our Lady of Sorrows) in Porto Alegre, Brazil.

 The event is a meeting of vocal ensembles singing compositions made around the 16th century (1400–1600),  including various types of sacred and secular polyphony. William Byrd, Giovanni da Palestrina,  Josquin des Prez, Claudio Monteverdi,  John Wilbye ,  Orlando di Lasso, Jacob Arcadelt, Thomas Morley, Filippo Azzaiolo, and Michael Praetorius, are some of the Renaissance composers performed.

See also
Renaissance music
Choir

References

Classical music festivals in Brazil
Music festivals in Brazil